Swype was a virtual keyboard for touchscreen smartphones and tablets originally developed by Swype Inc., founded in 2002, where the user enters words by sliding a finger or stylus from the first letter of a word to its last letter, lifting only between words. It uses error-correction algorithms and a language model to guess the intended word. It also includes a predictive text system, handwriting and speech recognition support. Swype was first commercially available on the Samsung Omnia II running Windows Mobile, and was originally pre-loaded on specific devices.

In October 2011, Swype Inc. was acquired by Nuance Communications where the company continued its development and implemented its speech recognition algorithm, Dragon Dictation.

In February 2018, Nuance announced that it had stopped development on the app and that no further updates will be made to it.

 The Android app was pulled from the Play Store. The iOS app was also pulled from the App Store. The trial version of Swype is not visible anymore for users in Play Store except users who have installed the app by accessing it in the installed apps part of the Play Store. Cloud features of the paid version such as "Backup&Sync" no longer function, and Nuance Communications has refused to issue refunds to customers who have purchased the app and can no longer reinstall it.

Users have to use Aptoide to download the full version of Swype.

Software 
Swype consists of three major components that contribute to its accuracy and speed: an input path analyzer, word search engine with corresponding database, and a manufacturer customizable interface.

The creators of Swype predict that users will achieve over 50 words per minute, with the chief technical officer (CTO) and founder Cliff Kushler claiming to have reached 55 words per minute. On 22 March 2010, a Swype employee by the name of Franklin Page achieved a new Guinness World Record of 35.54 seconds for the fastest text message on a touchscreen mobile phone using Swype on the Samsung i8000, and reportedly improved on 22 August of the same year to 25.94 using a Samsung Galaxy S. The Guinness world record text message consists of 160 characters in 25 words and was at that time typed in 25.94 seconds, which corresponds to a speed of nearly 58 words per minute, or 370 characters per minute. However, it has since been bettered by the Fleksy app on an Android phone to 18.19 seconds in 2014.

, Swype supports the following languages: 

Swype was listed among Time magazine's 50 Best Android Applications for 2013.

Availability 

In February 2018, the Android app was pulled from the Play Store. The iOS app was also pulled from the App Store.

Starting from 2018, users have to use Aptoide to download the full version of Swype.

In late February 2018, the full version of Swype was discontinued. The trial version of Swype is hidden from the Play Store and App Store. The Swype website was also discontinued and has become a redirect page to XT9 Smart Input.

In a statement emailed to The Verge, Nuance Communications said it would discontinue support of the Swype keyboard app and instead focus on other products. "The core technology behind Swype will continue to be utilized and improved upon across other Nuance offerings—and integrated into our broader AI-powered solutions—most notably in Android-based keyboard solutions for our automotive customers," the company said.

See also 
 Dasher (software)
 Keyboard (computing)
 Multi-touch
 Shorthand
 T9 (predictive text)

References

External links 
 United States Patent 7,098,896. C. Kushler, R. Marsden, "System and method for continuous stroke word-based text input"
 United States Patent 7,250,938. D. Kirkland, D. Kumhyr, E. Ratliff, K. Smith, "System and method for improved user input on personal computing devices"

Android (operating system) software
Android virtual keyboards
Symbian software
Virtual keyboards
Input methods for handheld devices